"Roll Away the Stone" is a song written by Ian Hunter, recorded by English rock band Mott the Hoople, and released as a single on the CBS label. On the first version, recorded before Mick Ralphs left the band, Ralphs plays lead guitar and one of the Thunderthighs handles the bridge voice. It was re-recorded by the band for their 1974 album The Hoople, with Ariel Bender on lead guitar and English vocalist Lynsey de Paul singing the vocal bridge.

It reached No. 8 on the UK Singles Chart for two weeks in December 1973, spending five weeks in the top 10. When the band appeared on the BBC Television show Top of the Pops on 15 November 1973, drummer Dale "Buffin" Griffin played the drums with two pool cues.

Cash Box said that "Hunter's unique, far reaching vocals are stronger than ever and the rest of the group backing him musically is up to the task." Record World called it Mott the Hoople's "biggest rocker since their label debut" and said that the "Easter-themed love epistle should sha-la-la itself to monumental status."

In 1986, the song was used as a background song on the 1974 edition of the BBC TV series The Rock 'n' Roll Years, for the news clips relating to the two general elections in the United Kingdom that year. It also featured in the 2015 film The Diary of a Teenage Girl, as well as on the soundtrack album.

References

Mott the Hoople songs
1973 singles
Songs written by Ian Hunter (singer)
Glam rock songs